3/8 is the fourth studio album by Hong Kong singer Kay Tse, released on 14 December 2007. It contains three new songs and 15 of her greatest hits.

Track listing

References

Kay Tse albums
2007 greatest hits albums
Cinepoly Records compilation albums